The Dominion Cinema is an independent Streamline Moderne cinema located in the Morningside area of Edinburgh, Scotland. The company was incorporated by William Cameron, on 13 May 1937 when he bought the land in Newbattle Terrace. The cinema was opened on 31 January 1938 originally seating 1300. It was designed by architect Thomas Bowhill Gibson in an Art Deco style.

The cinema, one of only three family run cinemas in Scotland has only been forced to close twice. The first occasion was in September 1939, when there were fears over air raids at the start of World War Two. However, the Dominion reopened a week later due to public demand. The second time, in 2020 as a result of the coronavirus (COVID-19) pandemic.

The cinema has had planned closures on three further occasions; in 1972, 1980 and 1998, each time to add more screens. The cinema still runs today as a four-screen venue, and in 1993 it was protected as a category B listed building. It is still run by the Cameron family.

References

External links 
 Dominion Cinema home page

Cinemas in Edinburgh
Category B listed buildings in Edinburgh
Streamline Moderne architecture in the United Kingdom
Art Deco architecture in Scotland